Lara Belmont (born 1980) is an English actress, best known for her role as Jessie in the 1999 film The War Zone. She also appeared in ITV's lavish costume drama Henry VIII as his eldest daughter Mary Tudor.

Belmont was born in Oxford, and worked as a model before she was spotted in the street by a casting director.

Selected filmography 
 1999 The War Zone
 2002 Ashes and Sand
 2002 The Swap
 2002 Long Time Dead
 2002 Crime and Punishment
 2003 Oh Marbella!
 2003 Killing Hitler
 2003 Henry VIII
 2005 Take Me Back
 2006 Someone Else
 2007 Rise of the Footsoldier
 2009 Wild Decembers
 2020 Winifred Meeks

References

External links 
 

Living people
1980 births
20th-century English actresses
21st-century English actresses
Actresses from Oxfordshire
English film actresses
English television actresses
People from Oxford
People from Stroud